= Ruiwen Zhang =

Ruiwen Zhang is a Chinese-American pharmaceutical scientist and is a Robert L. Boblitt Endowed Professor in Drug Discovery currently at the University of Houston. He is an Elected Fellow of the American Association for the Advancement of Science.
